"Magic in Your Eyes" is the sixth single released by Tomoko Kawase under the name Tommy February6. "Magic in Your Eyes" is the theme song for the Japanese drama: Okusama wa Majo - Bewitched in Tokyo. It was released on February 11, 2004. It peaked at number six on the Oricon singles chart and is certified gold in Japan. The cover artwork features Tommy February6's mascots, Little Twin Stars.

Track listing

External links 
 Tommy february6 Official Site

2004 singles
2004 songs
Tomoko Kawase songs
Defstar Records singles
Japanese television drama theme songs
Songs written by Tomoko Kawase
Songs written by Shunsaku Okuda